Michler is a surname. Notable people with the name include:

Frank Michler Chapman (1864–1945), American ornithologist and pioneering
Klaus Michler (born  1970), German field hockey player
Robert E. Michler, American surgeon
Wilhelm Michler (1846–1889), German chemist

See also
Michler's ketone, is an organic compound with the formula of [(CH3)2NC6H4]2CO
Micheler